The Treaty of Washington of 1900 was signed on November 7, 1900, and came into effect on March 23, 1901, when the ratifications were exchanged. The treaty sought to remove any ground of misunderstanding growing out of the interpretation of Article III of the 1898 Treaty of Paris by clarifying specifics of territories relinquished to the United States by Spain. It explicitly provided:

In consideration for that explicit statement of relinquishment, the United States agreed to pay to Spain the sum of one hundred thousand dollars ($100,000) within six months after the exchange of ratification. The Treaty of Washington is also known as the Cession Treaty.

See also
 German–Spanish Treaty (1899)

References

Spanish–American War
Treaties concluded in 1900
Treaties entered into force in 1901
Treaties of Spain under the Restoration
Spain–United States relations
1900 in the Spanish Empire